The 1963 NC State Wolfpack football team represented North Carolina State University during the 1963 NCAA University Division football season. The Wolfpack were led by 10th-year head coach Earle Edwards and played their home games at Riddick Stadium in Raleigh, North Carolina. They competed as members of the Atlantic Coast Conference, winning their second ever ACC title with a record of 6–1, a title shared with North Carolina. They were invited to the 1963 Liberty Bowl, the last to be played in Philadelphia before the game moved to Memphis, Tennessee, where they were defeated by Mississippi State.

Schedule

References

NC State
NC State Wolfpack football seasons
Atlantic Coast Conference football champion seasons
NC State Wolfpack football